The Confederate Monument, in Cadiz, Kentucky, was placed on the National Register of Historic Places in 1997. A marble memorial to the Confederate veterans of Trigg County it was erected in 1913 by the United Daughters of the Confederacy.

It has four Doric columns with a limestone cube in between. The cube was once a fountain.

It was located on a lawn in front of a historic courthouse, but the courthouse was demolished in 2008 and replaced by a new justice center in 2009.

References

1913 sculptures
Civil War Monuments of Kentucky MPS
National Register of Historic Places in Trigg County, Kentucky
United Daughters of the Confederacy monuments and memorials in Kentucky
1913 establishments in Kentucky
Cadiz, Kentucky